A bookmaker is an organisation or a person that takes bets on sporting and other events at agreed upon odds.

Organisations

Current

 Europe

888sport (Gibraltar, owned by 888 Holdings)
Bet365 (United Kingdom, owned by the Coates family)
Betclic (France / Malta, owned by Stéphane Courbit and SBM)
Betfair (United Kingdom, owned by Flutter)
Betfred (United Kingdom / Gibraltar, owned by Fred Done)
Betsson (Sweden / Malta)
BetVictor (Gibraltar, owned by Michael Tabor)
Betway (Malta / Guernsey)
Boylesports (Ireland)
Bwin (Austria, owned by Entain)
Eurofootball (Bulgaria)
Fonbet (Russia)
Coral (United Kingdom, owned by Entain)
Ladbrokes (United Kingdom, owned by Entain)
LeoVegas (Sweden)
Liga Stavok (Russia)
Marathonbet (Russia)
Paddy Power (Ireland, owned by Flutter)
SBOBET (Isle of Man / Philippines, owned by Celton Manx)
Sky Bet (United Kingdom, owned by Flutter)
Sportingbet (United Kingdom, owned by Entain)
The Tote (United Kingdom)
Totolotek (Poland)
Unibet (Malta, owned by the Kindred Group)
William Hill (United Kingdom)

 Africa

Bet9ja (Nigeria, owned by Ayo Ojuroye and Kunle Soname)
Betika (Kenya)
Hollywoodbets (South Africa)
SportPesa (Kenya)

 Americas

BetOnline (Panama)
BetUS (Costa Rica)
DraftKings (United States)
FanDuel (United States, owned by Flutter)
Pinnacle Sports (Curaçao)

 Asia-Pacific

Dafabet (Philippines, owned by AsianBGE)
Sportsbet.com.au (Australia, owned by Flutter)

Former

BetEasy
Centrebet
Stanley Leisure

People
John Zancocchio (1954-)
Victor Chandler (1951–)
Barney Eastwood (1932–2020)
Philip Giaccone (1932–1981)
Freddie Williams (1942–2008)
William Hill (1903–1971)
Martin Krugman (1919–1979)
Frank Rosenthal (1929–2008)
Cyril Stein (1928–2011)
Helen Vernet (1876–1956)
Ratan Khatri India's matka gambling king  (1932-2020)

References